Nohead Bottom is an unincorporated community in Middlesex County, Virginia, United States. It was also known as Nohead.

References

Unincorporated communities in Middlesex County, Virginia
Unincorporated communities in Virginia